Tram Hollow may refer to:

Tram Hollow (Oregon County, Missouri)
Tram Hollow (Ripley County, Missouri)